Power of Women is a 2005 Indian Tamil-language drama film, written and directed by P. Jayadevi. The film stars Khushbu, Hariharan and Riyaz Khan.  Music for the film was composed by Vidyasagar and the film opened to mixed reviews on 27 May 2005.

Plot
Aatma (Hariharan) is an international fusion singer and social activist, who protests for the emancipation of women and writes books on the subject. His latest book, Marana Sasanam, proves to be controversial and subsequently leads to him being put under house arrest. Through a flashback to visiting students, he narrates the story of the Indian village girl Jyoti (Khushbu) who marries and is then widowed in her formative years, resulting in her dropping out of education. She then marries a wealthy NRI, Shyam (Riyaz Khan), and leaves India to head to Canada.

She copes well with the change in her lifestyle until she discovers that Shyam operates an illegal passport business, hence Jyoti attempts to rebel in vain against her husband. Aatma befriends her and offers her solace and subsequently Shyam suspects his wife and Aatma of having an illicit relationship. Jyothi then hears that her husband is going to blow up the CN Tower in Canada, and decides to tell the police but is killed by Shyam. The film concludes with Aatma revealing the various instances in the holy books of different religions which give woman only a secondary status and remarks about his displeasure at the current status quo. The court subsequently chooses not to ban the book.

Cast
 Khushbu as Jothi
 Hariharan as Aatma
 Riyaz Khan as Shyam
 Amanda Prasow

Production
Singer Hariharan joined the film's cast in August 2001 and made his acting debut with the venture. Kausalya was selected to portray another female lead however it proved false. Scenes were shot in Toronto, Canada during May 2002 with Hariharan and Kushboo. The film languished in development hell and in an interview in November 2004, Kushboo revealed that the film was still in production.

Release
The film opened in May 2005 to mixed reviews, with a critic from BizHat.com noting that "the director should be commended for attempting to tell a tale of male domination in society", adding that "the narration is very jerky" and that "he saving grace of the film is Kushboo, who plays the traumatic woman putting up a brave front". Likewise, a reviewer from the AllIndianSite labelled the film as "below average", noting that "Jayadevi's story is initially strong", but "the last few scenes are unpardonably slow and didactic" and that the "screenplay meanders through undulating terrain".

Soundtrack
The film's soundtrack was composed by Vidyasagar.
 "Maragatha Mazhaithuli" – Hariharan, Sadhana Sargam
 "Malare Nee Vazhga" – Hariharan, Sujatha Mohan
 "Panae Undhan" – Hariharan
 "Thathithi Thaththi – Shankar Mahadevan, Anuradha Sriram
 "All Over Round" – Clinton Cerejo

References

External links
 

2005 films
2000s Tamil-language films
Films scored by Vidyasagar
Films about women in India
2000s feminist films
2005 drama films
2005 directorial debut films